Romy Logsch (born 5 February 1982 in Leipzig) is a former German bobsledder who had competed between 2006 and 2012.

Career
She won two gold medals in the two-woman event at the FIBT World Championships, earning them in 2007 and 2008. At the 2010 Winter Olympics in Vancouver, Logsch was disqualified when she was ejected from her sled after it had crashed out in the final run of the two-woman event.

References

External links

1982 births
Living people
German female bobsledders
Bobsledders at the 2010 Winter Olympics
Olympic bobsledders of Germany
Sportspeople from Leipzig
21st-century German women